Fuensanta may refer to:

 Fuensanta, Albacete, a municipality in Albacete, Castile-La Mancha, Spain. 
 The Virgin Mary in Murcia, Spain.
 La Fuensanta, a painting by Julio Romero de Torres.